Delizia is a 1987 Italian sex comedy directed by Joe D'Amato as Aristide Massaccesi.

Plot
Italy, late 1980s. An Italian fashion model living in New York decides to sell a villa located in the central Italian countryside.

Cast

 Tinì Cansino as Carol
 Luca Giordana as Claudio
 Giorgio Pietrangeli 
 Adriana Russo 
 Maurizio Marchisio 
 Pippo Cairelli 
 Stefania Miniucchi 
 Gina Poli
 Antonio Zequila 
 Laura Gemser uncredited

Release
The film was theatrically released in Italy on February 14, 1987.

See also
 List of Italian films of 1987

References

External links
 

Films directed by Joe D'Amato
1987 films
Italian sex comedy films
1980s sex comedy films
Films scored by Stefano Mainetti
1987 comedy films
1980s Italian films